The Archdeacon of Coventry is a senior ecclesiastical officer in the Church of England Diocese of Coventry. The post has been called the Archdeacon Pastor since 2012.

History
The post was historically within the Diocese of Lichfield beginning in the 12th century – around the time when archdeacon first started to occur in England. From 24 January 1837, the archdeaconry was in the Diocese of Worcester, and since 6 September 1918 it has been in the Diocese of Coventry. From 2009, the archdeacon of Coventry also had statutory oversight over the Archdeaconry of Warwick, delegated from the Archdeacon Missioner, in preparation for the merging of the two archdeaconries. This arrangement may or may not still be legally in effect following the end of use of the terms "of Warwick/of Coventry" (Rodham and Green remained, legally, collated to the Archdeaconries of Warwick and of Coventry).

List of archdeacons

High Medieval
aft. 1135–1161 (res.): Richard Peche
aft. 1161–bef. 1175: Edmund
bef. 1176–aft. 1184: Nicholas
bef. 1184–aft. 1189: Richard Brito (I)
bef. 1210–aft. 1210: Richard de Leghes
: Robert de Bosco
: Richard of Gloucester
bef. –aft. 1245: Alexander of Hales
bef. 1240–aft. 1242: Adam de Hoo
bef. 1245–aft. 1245: Lawrence of St Martin
bef. 1248–1255 (res.): William of Kilkenny
bef. 1272–bef. 1286: John Kirkby
: Richard Brito (II)
bef. –aft. 1297: Robert Stafford
14 November 1299–?: Peter de Insula

Late Medieval
?–bef. 1302 (d.): Gregory Giudice de Alatri
1302–29 August 1320 (exch.): Richard (son of Anibaldus Riccardi de Urbe)
29 August 1320 – 27 August 1335 (d.): John Cardinal Gaetani de Urbe (Cardinal-deacon of St Theodore)
27 August 1335 – 11 April 1340: Vacant (due to an ongoing dispute between the king and the pope)
11 April 1340–bef. 1349: Humphrey de Hastanges
11 July 1349–aft. 1352 (deprived): Hugh de Marisco (not consistently in post)
3 September 1349–bef. 1351 (d.): William de Sallowe
12 February 1352–bef. 1354 (d.): William Cross
30 July 1354 – 1355 (deprived): Richard Boule
25 January 1355 – 20 September 1358 (exch.): William de Driffield
20 September 1358–bef. 1361 (d.): John de Pipe
14 August 1361–bef. 1369 (res.): Richard de Birmingham
22 November–24 December 1369 (exch.): William Lombe
24 December 1369–bef. 1408 (d.): Robert de Stretton
20 June 1408 – 18 June 1422 (res.): Robert de Oxton
18 June 1422 – 1433 (res.): John Heyworth
22 May 1433–bef. 1442 (res.): Robert Esple
29 June 1442–bef. 1488 (d.): Roger Wall
1 December 1488 – 30 January 1505 (d.): Thomas Mills
aft. 1505–bef. 1509: George Strangeways
aft. 1509–1512 (res.): Ralph Colyngwood (afterwards Dean of Lichfield)
2 October 1512–bef. 1558 (d.): John Blythe

Early modern
– (deprived): Henry Comberford (disputed)
1560–July 1577 (d.): Thomas Lever
August 1577 – 1584 (res.): William James
14 November 1584 – 1631 (d.): William Hinton
13 May–16 September 1631 (d.): Samuel Brooke
29 September 1631 – 1642 (res.): Ralph Brownrigg
1643–bef. 1661 (d.): Francis Walsall (disputed)
1661–3 March 1673 (d.): John Riland
10 March 1673–bef. 1684 (d.): George Downing
1684–20 April 1703 (d.): Lancelot Addison (also Dean of Lichfield since 1683)
26 July 1703–bef. 1708 (d.): Richard Davies 
9 August 1708–bef. 1741 (d.): William Wilson
9 June 1741 – 2 July 1778 (d.): Thomas Smallbrook
22 July 1778 – 4 April 1793 (d.): Norman Fotheringham
16 May 1793 – 20 February 1816 (d.): William Vyse
14 March 1816 – 28 September 1827 (d.): Charles Buckeridge
19 October 1827–bef. 1851 (res.): William Spooner
The archdeaconry was in Worcester diocese from 24 January 1837.
31 March 1851 – 22 March 1873 (d.): John Sandford

Late modern
1873–1887 (ret.): Charles Holbech
1887–1908 (ret.): William Bree
1908–9 November 1922 (d.): George Arbuthnot
On 6 September 1918, the archdeaconry was moved to the new Diocese of Coventry.
1923–1927 (res.): Claude Blagden
1927–1935 (res.): Joseph Hunkin
1935–1940 (res.): Richard Brook
1941–1946 (res.): Richard Howard (also Provost of Coventry, 1933–1958)
1946–1965 (ret.): Leonard Stanford (afterwards archdeacon emeritus)
1965–1977 (ret.): Eric Buchan (afterwards archdeacon emeritus)
1977–1983 (res.): Peter Bridges
1983–1989 (res.): Alan Morgan
1989–2000 (ret.): Ian Russell
2001–2007 (res.): Mark Bryant
2008–2012 (ret,): Ian Watson (afterwards archdeacon emeritus)
December 201231 August 2017: John Green (Acting, April–December 2012; called Archdeacon Pastor)
July 201718 March 2018: Clive Hogger (Acting; assistant archdeacon since March 2018)
18 March 2018January 2023 (res.): Sue Field (called Archdeacon Pastor) was required to resign in January 2023 following disciplinary proceedings.

References

Sources

Lists of Anglicans
 
Lists of English people